The NEC μPD7720 is the name of fixed point digital signal processors from NEC (currently Renesas Electronics).  Announced in 1980, it became, along with the Texas Instruments TMS32010, one of the most popular DSPs of its day.

Background
In the late 1970s, telephone engineers were attempting to create technology with sufficient performance to enable digital touch-tone dialing.  Existing digital signal processing solutions required over a hundred chips and consumed significant amounts of power. Intel responded to this potential market by introducing the Intel 2920, an integrated processor that, while it had both digital-to-analog and analog-to-digital converters, lacked additional features (such as a hardware multiplier) that would be found in later processors.  Announcements for the first "real" DSPs, the NEC μPD7720 and the Bell Labs DSP-1 chip, occurred the following year at the 1980 IEEE International Solid-State Circuits conference.  The μPD7720 first became available in 1981 and commercially available in late 1982 at a cost of US$600 each (approx. $ today).  Beyond their initial use in telephony, these processors found applications in disk drive and graphics controllers, speech synthesis and modems.

Architecture
Detailed descriptions of the μPD7720 architecture are found in Chance (1990), Sweitzer (1984) and Simpson (1984).  Briefly, the NEC μPD7720 runs at 4 MHz frequency with 128-word data RAM, 512-word data ROM, and 512-word program memory, which has VLIW-like instruction format, enabling all of ALU operation, address register increment/decrement operation, and move operation in one cycle.

Variants

The NEC μPD77C25, which succeeded the μPD7720, runs at 8 MHz frequency with 256-word data RAM, 1,024-word data ROM, and 2,048-word program memory.

References

External links
 Datasheets for the UPD7720A, UPD7720AC and UPD7720AD are available here.

muPD07720
Digital signal processors